Combest is a surname. Notable people with the surname include:

Casey Combest (born 1980), American track and field sprinter
Jimmy Combest (1926–2013), American jockey and trainer in Thoroughbred racing
Larry Combest (born 1945), American politician